Cosmic Voyage is a 1996 short documentary film produced in the IMAX format, directed by Bayley Silleck, produced by Jeffrey Marvin, and narrated by Morgan Freeman. The film was presented by the Smithsonian Institution's National Air and Space Museum,
and played in IMAX theaters worldwide. The film is available in the DVD format.

Synopsis 
Cosmic Voyage has a format similar to Eva Szasz's Cosmic Zoom, and Charles and Ray Eames's classic Powers of Ten educational video. All were based on the 1957 book Cosmic View by Dutch educator Kees Boeke. Cosmic Voyage takes viewers on a journey through forty-two orders of magnitude, beginning at a celebration in Venice, Italy and slowly zooming out into the edge of the observable universe. Then the view descends back to Earth, and later zooms in upon a raindrop on a leaf on a hoop used in the Italian celebration, down to the level of subatomic particles (quarks).

In addition, the film offers some brief insight on the Big Bang theory, black holes, and the development of the Solar System. It also simulates a journey through Fermilab's Tevatron particle accelerator in Chicago, where an atom collision is depicted.

Awards 
Cosmic Voyage was nominated for a 1997 Academy Award under the category of Best Documentary Short Subject.

References

External links 

1996 films
1996 documentary films
1996 short films
1990s 3D films
1990s English-language films
1990s short documentary films
3D documentary films
3D short films
American short documentary films
Films scored by David Michael Frank
IMAX documentary films
IMAX short films
1990s American films
Films set in Venice